Port Allen is a populated place at Hanapepe Bay, 20 nautical miles from Nawiliwili, in Kauai County,  in the U.S. state of Hawaii. Originally named Eleele Landing, terminal owner Kauai Railway renamed it for Honolulu business man and port financial backer Samuel Clesson Allen. When the Civilian Conservation Corps Camp in Koke'e State Park was built in 1935, the lumber for the camp was floated in saltwater as a built-in deterrent to termites, and brought ashore at Port Allen. Captain James Cook landed on Kauai in this area. The facilities were demolished in 1982 by Hurricane Iwa, but eventually rebuilt.

References

Ports and harbors of Hawaii
Port cities and towns in Hawaii
Populated places in Kauai County, Hawaii